Shamozai is a union council in Swat District of Khyber Pakhtunkhwa. It is located at the edge of Swat river and have border with Lower Dir. Villages present in it are Zarkhela, Khazana, Rangila, Terang, Gumbatuna, Ghari, Nimogram, Landake, Gamkot etc. The local language of this place is Pashto.

References

Tehsil and District of Swat. Shamozai Swat.

Swat District